Polish singer Sasha Strunin has released two studio albums, one extended play, ten singles, and nine music videos.

Albums

Studio albums

EPs

Singles

As lead artist

As featured artist

Music videos

Notes

References

Pop music discographies
Discographies of Polish artists